Edward Leo Farrell (June 14, 1885 – July 18, 1953) was an American  track and field athlete who competed in the 1912 Summer Olympics. He was born in Boston, Massachusetts and died in Watertown, Massachusetts. In 1912 he finished 13th in the triple jump event and 14th in the long jump competition.

References

External links
 

1885 births
1953 deaths
American male long jumpers
American male triple jumpers
Olympic track and field athletes of the United States
Athletes (track and field) at the 1912 Summer Olympics